Selin Ciğerci (born 4 April 1984) is a Turkish transgender Internet celebrity, singer and businessperson. Ciğerci has been working in the field of pop music since mid-2017.

Biography 

Selin Ciğerci was born in Istanbul in 1984 in a conservative family. Having a father from Konya and a mother from Kastamonu, Ciğerci's family was poor at first, but after his father owned a ready-made clothing company, they rose to the top financially. Ciğerci participated in the 4th season of the program called Wipe Out, using the pseudonym "Okan Ünsal".

She has her own cosmetic product brand called "Selin Beauty".

Ciğerci married football player Gökhan Çıra on 28 October 2019. Demet Akalın, a close friend of Ciğerci's wedding witness. Ciğerci is transgendered. Ciğerci divorced on 10 September 2021 with Gökhan Çıra on the grounds that there were various differences of opinion. In the news published on 5 January 2022, it was reported that Selin Ciğerci and Gökhan Çıra got together. The couple got married again on 16 May 2022

References 

The information in this article is based on that in its Turkish equivalent.

External links 
 

1984 births
Living people
Transgender women
Internet celebrities
Turkish transgender people
Transgender singers
Turkish LGBT singers